Allatostatins are neuropeptide hormones in insects and crustacea. They have a twofold function: they both inhibit the generation of juvenile hormone and reduce their food intake. They are therefore putative targets for insecticide research.

Types

Three biochemically distinct types of Allatostatin have been described: A, B and C. Although originally identified in different insects, all three types are found in the fruitfly, Drosophila. These types of Allatostatin are not normally found in the same neurons, and so probably have different roles.

Control of food intake

Allatostatin is found in the cells in a small neuronal cluster, the frontal ganglion. It is also present in the axons which leave the frontal ganglion and run across the surface of the gut. Application of low concentrations of Allatostatin inhibit the spontaneous contractions of the gut. All three forms of Allatostatin appear to inhibit gut motility in all the insects which have been tested.

Interaction with juvenile hormone

Juvenile hormone is synthesised in the corpora allata.  In every insect tested, at least one of the three types of Allatostatin inhibits the biosynthesis of juvenile hormone. This is achieved by paracrine release of Allatostatin  from neurons in the brain which terminate in the corpora allata. The signal is transduced by GPCR receptors, but the intracellular pathway is not yet known. Other amine and neuropeptide neurotransmitters may also inhibit juvenile hormone biosynthesis.

References

Peptide hormones
Insect hormones